L'Ange-Gardien or Ange-Gardien may refer to:
L'Ange-Gardien, Outaouais, Quebec, in Les Collines-de-l'Outaouais Regional County Municipality
L'Ange-Gardien, Capitale-Nationale, Quebec, in La Côte-de-Beaupré Regional County Municipality
Ange-Gardien, Quebec, in Rouville Regional County Municipality in Montérégie
 The former L'Ange-Gardien in Montérégie which amalgamated into Ange-Gardien in 1997

See also 
 L'Ange-Gardien, Ontario